Moira Dempsey Modzelewski (born 30 May 1958) is an American lawyer and former Captain in the United States Navy. Until her retirement in 2018, she served as Chief Judge of the Navy and one of four assistant judge advocates general. Modzelewski is notable for her appointment to serve as the 
Presiding Officer 
over Noor Uthman Muhammaed's Guantanamo military commission.

Education

Teaching career

Modzelewski taught English at Szechuan University after earning her bachelor's degree, in 1980.
This was shortly after China and the United States re-opened diplomatic relations.

In 1989 Modzelewski was an assistant professor at the United States Naval Academy.

In 1995–96 Modzelewski opened the detachment of the Naval Justice School in Norfolk.

Legal career

All of Modzelewski's legal career has been in the United States Navy.
In addition to her teaching postings she has served as a lawyer or administrator of legal services in 
over a half dozen posts.

In 2009 she presided over the courts-martial of Navy SEALs from SEAL Team 10 who were charged with beating an Iraqi captive.

She was subsequently appointed was to serve as a Presiding Officer in Guantanamo.
In April 2010 she predicted she would require a year to review the secret evidence against Noor Uthman Muhammaed.

Modzelewski joined the Navy-Marine Corps Court of Criminal Appeals in 2011 and became its Chief Judge on 6 August 2013. She was appointed Chief Judge of the Navy after the retirement of Christian L. Reismeier on 1 July 2015.

Modzelewski retired from active duty on 12 July 2018. She was succeeded as Chief Judge of the Navy by Charles N. Purnell II.

Personal
Modzelewski is the daughter of Navy physician John Joseph "Jack" Dempsey (26 June 1925 – 1 August 2004) and retired Navy nurse Joan Louise Barron Dempsey (9 March 1926 – 20 January 2001). She has three sisters and one brother.

Modzelewski is married to retired Navy officer Stephen Anthony Modzelewski Jr. They were married on 7 January 1989 in Norfolk, Virginia. The couple have three sons and one daughter.

References

External links

1958 births
Living people
People from Hagåtña, Guam
University of Virginia alumni
Academic staff of Sichuan University
University of Virginia School of Law alumni
American lawyers
Female United States Navy officers
United States Navy captains
Guantanamo Military Commission members
Judges of the United States Court of Military Commission Review